The Haliday Island Wildlife Sanctuary (also just known as the Haliday Wildlife Sanctuary) is one of several wildlife sanctuaries in the nation of India. Located in the state of West Bengal, the area is approximately six square kilometers in size. It is a part of the 'Sundarbans Biosphere Reserve', with the Sundarbans region as a whole becoming a 'Biosphere Reserve' officially in 1989. The wildlife-heavy areas there are regarded as an environmentally-minded tourist destination.

Situated on the river Matla, many different types of flora and fauna exist within the wildlife sanctuary. Examples include spotted deer and wild boar. Bengal tigers have occasionally visited the area as well.

See also

Administration of the Sundarbans
Lothian Island Wildlife Sanctuary
Sundarbans National Park
Wildlife sanctuaries of India

References

External links
 'West Bengal Wildlife Sanctuaries' - wildbengal.com

Islands of West Bengal
Geography of South 24 Parganas district
Sundarbans
Wildlife sanctuaries in West Bengal
1989 establishments in West Bengal
Protected areas established in 1989
Uninhabited islands of India
Islands of India